Joseph Henderson, 1st Baron Henderson of Ardwick (1884 – 26 February 1950) was a Labour Party politician in the United Kingdom.

He won money in the Irish Sweep and went on to become Lord Mayor of Carlisle from 1927-1928. He was President of the National Union of Railwaymen from 1934 to 1937 before being succeeded by Walter T. Griffiths.

He was elected as Member of Parliament (MP) for Manchester Ardwick at a by-election in June 1931, following the death of the Labour MP Thomas Lowth. At the general election in October 1931, when Labour split over Ramsay MacDonald's formation of a National Government, he lost the seat to the Conservative Party candidate Albert George Hubert Fuller.

Henderson regained the seat at the 1935 general election, and represented Manchester Ardwick in the House of Commons until he was elevated to the peerage in the Dissolution Honours List on 22 January 1950, as Baron Henderson of Ardwick, of Morton Park in the City of Carlisle. He died only five weeks later, in Carlisle, on 26 February, aged 65, when the title became extinct.

References

External links 

1884 births
Labour Party (UK) MPs for English constituencies
UK MPs 1929–1931
UK MPs 1935–1945
UK MPs 1945–1950
UK MPs who were granted peerages
1950 deaths
Labour Party (UK) hereditary peers
National Union of Railwaymen-sponsored MPs
Presidents of the National Union of Railwaymen
Ministers in the Attlee governments, 1945–1951
Barons created by George VI